Hiwaga ng Pag-ibig ("Mystery of Love") is a 1912 Tagalog-language novel written by Filipino novelist Mamerto A. Hilario.  The romance novel was published in Manila, Philippines by Limbagang Magiting ni Honorio Lopez (Heroic Printing Press of Honorio Lopez).

See also
Pag-ibig at Kamatayan

References

1912 novels
Tagalog-language novels
Philippine romance novels